The Norrland Dragoon Regiment, also K 4, is a Swedish Army unit specialized in arctic warfare and special operations. Located in the province of Lappland, it was historically a cavalry unit that traces its origins back to the 17th century.

History 

The regiment has its origin in the Ångermanland, Medelpad and Jämtland Regiment raised in 1646. From 1689 on, this regiment was named Jämtland Dragoon Regiment, but had only one company of cavalry troops. This company was semi-separate, with the name Jämtland Cavalry Company and had been split off from Bohus-Jämtland Cavalry Squadron in 1670. The company was renamed  in 1802 and after receiving another squadron it was organized into a battalion and renamed  in 1834.

The corps gained full status as a separate unit in 1853 and was given the designation K 8 (8th Cavalry Regiment). It was renamed Norrland Dragoon Regiment in 1892 and when merged with parts of the Crown Prince's Hussar Regiment in 1927 it was redesignated K 4 but kept its name before being reorganized to a battalion and renamed Norrland's Dragoons in 1958. Finally the regiment was renamed back to its old name in 1980.

On 31 December 2004, Norrland Dragoon Regiment (K 4) was disbanded. From 1 January 2005 the regiment was transferred to a disbandment organization until the disbandment was completed by 30 June 2006. However, the training battalion at the regiment remained in the Swedish Armed Forces' basic organization and was placed in Norrbotten Regiment as the Army Ranger Battalion (AJB) with a permanent base in Arvidsjaur.

The unit was re-raised and was inaugurated on 24 September 2021. The inauguration was attended by His Majesty the King Carl XVI Gustaf, Prime Minister Stefan Löfven and the Supreme Commander of the Swedish Armed Forces, General Micael Bydén.

Campaigns 
See also the campaigns for Jämtland Ranger Regiment.

Organization 
1833

 Livskvadronen
 Alsens skvadron

See also the organization for Jämtland Ranger Regiment.

Heraldry and traditions

Colours, standards and guidons

The unit presents one guidon. Its first was presented on 30 September 1902 by major general Carl Warberg. A new one was presented to the regiment by the Chief of the Army, lieutenant general, count Carl August Ehrenswärd at the regimental barracks in Umeå on 20 September 1955. The guidon is drawn by Brita Grep and embroidered by hand in insertion technique by the company Libraria. Blazon: "On swallow-tailed blue cloth the provincial badge of Jämtland; a white elk passant, attacked on its back by a rising falcon and in the front by a rampant dog, both yellow. On a white border at the upper side of the guidon, battle honours (Nowodwor 1655) in blue. Blue fringe." From 1957, the regimental letters as replaced from "NDR" to "ND", when the regiment was to be reduced to a battalion in 1958.

Coat of arms
The coat of the arms of the Norrland Dragoon Regiment (K 4) was used between 1977 and 2004. Blazon: "Azure, the provincial badge of Jämtland, an elk passant argent, attacked on the back by a rising falcon and in the front by a rampant dog both or; all animals armed and langued gules. The shield surmounted two rapiers in saltire or". Prior to the unit being re-raised in 2021, it received a new coat of arms similar to the old one. Blazon: "Azure, the provincial badge of Jämtland, an elk passant argent, attacked on the back by a rising falcon and in the front by a rampant dog both or; all animals armed and langued or. The shield surmounted two rapiers in saltire or".

Medals
The medal ribbon was of blue moiré with an orange stripe on the middle.

Other
The regimental anniversary is 20 September, as a memory to the Battle of Nowy Dwór on 20 September 1655. The battle honour is shared with Jämtland Ranger Regiment (I 5).

Commanding officers
Regimental commander 1893–1957 and 1980–2004. From 1957 to 1980, the unit was a training battalion where the commanding officer was called battalion commander and was subordinate to the commander officer of Västerbotten Regiment.

1893–1893: Knut Gillis Bildt (acting)
1893-1895: Gustaf Magnus Oskar Roger Björnstjerna
1895–1904: Gustaf Adolf Löwenhielm
1904–1914: Wilhelm Aschan
1914–1917: Adolf Adelswärd
1917–1919: Henric Ståhl
1919–1922: Axel Ahnström
1922–1930: Rickman von der Lancken
1930–1935: Archibald Douglas
1935–1940: Carl Björnstjerna
1940–1943: Sven Colliander
1943–1947: Henric Lagercrantz
1947–1951: Sven David Oskar Hermelin
1951–1952: James Axel John Maule
1952–1957: Carl Johan Wachtmeister
1957–1963: Gustaf William Frisén
1963–1972: Ingemar Bondeson
1972–1978: Claes Berthold Mikael Dieden
1978–1980: Per Blomquist
1980–1982: Per Blomquist
1982–1984: Lars Wallén
1984–1986: Per Stig Lennart Mohlin (acting)
1986–1989: Björn Lundquist
1989–1992: Mertil Melin
1992–1996: Johan Kihl
1996–2000: Frank Westman
2000–2003: Gunnar Söderström
2004–2005: Bengt Sandström
2005–2021: –
2021–20xx: Teddy Larsson

Names, designations and locations

See also
 List of Swedish cavalry regiments

Footnotes

References

Notes

Print

Further reading

Cavalry regiments of the Swedish Army
Military units and formations established in 1893
Military units and formations disestablished in 2004
Military units and formations established in 2021
1893 establishments in Sweden
2004 disestablishments in Sweden
2021 establishments in Sweden
Umeå Garrison